Viktoria Petrivna Siumar (born 23 October 1977) is a Ukrainian journalist and politician.

Biography
Siumar formerly worked as an anchor for Hromadske Radio, as a freelance journalist for Voice of America in Ukraine, and as a lecturer at the Taras Shevchenko National University Institute of Journalism. From March to June 2014, she served as the Deputy Secretary of the National Security and Defence Council. In June 2014, Siumar was a member and potential party leader of (the party) Volia. Representing People's Front, she was elected to the Ukrainian parliament in the October 2014 Ukrainian parliamentary election. Since December 2014, she has been heading the Committee on Freedom of Speech and Information Policy.

In the July 2019 Ukrainian parliamentary election Siumar was placed sixteenth of the party list of European Solidarity. She was elected to parliament.

The information referred to in the declaration of assets, revenues, expenditures and financial liabilities is shown on the official website of the Verkhovna Rada of Ukraine :
http://gapp.rada.gov.ua/declview/home/preview/17948

References 

1977 births
Living people
People from Nikopol, Ukraine
Taras Shevchenko National University of Kyiv, Historical faculty alumni
Academic staff of the University of Kyiv, Journalism Institute
Eighth convocation members of the Verkhovna Rada
Independent politicians in Ukraine
Liberty (political party) politicians
Ukrainian journalists
21st-century Ukrainian women politicians
Hromadske Radio people
Ninth convocation members of the Verkhovna Rada
Women members of the Verkhovna Rada